The Iceland women's national under-20 basketball team is a national basketball team of Iceland, administered by the Icelandic Basketball Association. It represents the country in women's international under-20 basketball competitions.

FIBA U20 Women's European Championship participations

See also
Iceland women's national basketball team
Iceland women's national under-18 basketball team
Iceland men's national under-20 basketball team

References

External links
Archived records of Iceland team participations

Basketball in Iceland
Basketball
Women's national under-20 basketball teams